Sheihantaur, the mausoleum of Sheikh Hovendi at-Tahur, is an architectural monument in Tashkent, Uzbekistan.

Hovendi at-Tahur
Sheikh Hovendi at-Tahur (Sheihantaur) was born at the end of the 13th century. He was a sayyid, meaning that he claimed descent from the Quraish, the tribe of the prophet Muhammad. His father, Sheikh Umar, was believed to be a direct descendant in the seventeenth generation of Umar ibn al-Khattab, therefore male members of this family also bore the title of Khoja & Arif (Khwaja). Sheikh Khoja Umar was a sufi and one of the followers of Dervish Hasan Bulgari. He arrived in Tashkent with a mission to disseminate Islam. He then moved to the mountain settlement of Bog-i Ston where he spent the rest of his life. Thus the birthplace of Sheikh Khoja Hovendi at-Tahur was Bog-i Ston close to the Charvak Lake in the Tashkent Province of Uzbekistan. Young Sheihantaur was initiated into the Yasaviyya order of Dervishes in the town of Yasi (now Turkestan in modern-day Kazakhstan) where already at that time the Sufi Sheikh Khoja Ahmad Yasavi, the founder of the order, was revered. After long wanderings around Ma wara'u'n-nahr, Sheihantaur came to Tashkent where he remained in the memory of the people as the wisest of the wise. The Sheikh died between 1355 and 1360.

The mausoleum  of Sheihantaur

The mazar (mausoleum) of Sheihantaur was erected in the 14th century, but its outward appearance has changed repeatedly over the years. There is a unique sacred Saur of Iskander beside the gravestone of the Mausoleum. The Saur is a local variety of coniferous tree, which was already all but extinct in the 15th century. Is believed that their origin is connected with the name of Alexander the Great, who is widely honoured in the East as a mythical hero or Pahlewan. It is possible that this spot was chosen as Sheihantaur's burial place owing to presence here of these remarkable Saurs. The proportions of the mausoleum are: 16.2 x 9 m. width, 12.8 m. height.

Shaihantaur burial complex
The mausoleum is surrounded by a burial complex to which the saint has given his name. Until the Soviet period the name Shaihantaur was applied to a whole district (locally mahalla) of the city of Tashkent. Many of the outstanding persons of Tashkent's history were buried here during the ensuing years. One of them was the Hakem (chief of mahalla) of Sheihantaur, Yunus Khoja, the ruler of Tashkent when it was a semi-independent city-state in the 18th century. Another remarkable person, buried here, was Alimqul Parvarchi - the Kokandian General who defended Tashkent against the Russians in 1864-5, but was eventually killed in  skirmish before Chimkent, shortly before the two-day siege of Tashkent by General Mikhail Grigorevich Cherniaev in 1865, which led to the capture of the city.

Of the sixteen monuments of the Shaihantaur burial complex, only three remain intact. In addition to the mausoleum of Shaihantaur, the mausoleum of Qaldirghochbiy and that of Yunus Khan of Moghulistan are also to be found at that place.

See also
 Gates of Tashkent
 Tourism in Uzbekistan

References

External links

 Tashkent history and photos.
 The Mausoleum of Sheihantaur, location.
 

Mausoleums in Uzbekistan
Buildings and structures in Tashkent
Tourist attractions in Tashkent